The Type 072III landing ship (NATO designation Yuting-I class) is the follow-on of the Type 072II landing ships initially introduced in the 1990s by the People's Republic of China. Type 072-III features a redesigned concealed bridge, and possibly enhanced sealift capability. The main difference between Type 072III and its predecessor Type 072II is that Type 072III incorporates a helicopter platform at stern (no hangar). A total of eleven ships have entered service with People's Liberation Army Navy (PLAN), and all of them were built by China Shipbuilding Shipyard (中华造船厂) in Shanghai. 6 Type 072III are deployed in PLAN South Sea Fleet (SSF), and the remaining are deployed in PLAN  East Sea Fleet (ESF).

Ships of the class

Possible railgun testing
In February 2018, images were released via electronic media of Haiyang Shan (936). the fourth ship of the class, with what appeared to be a railgun mounted on the ship's bow. Later reports confirmed it was rail-gun being used for dock-side testing. The Chinese have since made a "break-through" in power-generation and are now planning for sea-trials.

See also
People's Liberation Army Navy Surface Force
List of active People's Liberation Army Navy ships

References

External links
Global Security Chinese Warships (globalsecurity.org)

Amphibious warfare vessel classes
Amphibious warfare vessels of the People's Liberation Army Navy